Žiželice may refer to:

 Žiželice (Kolín District), village in Kolín District, Czech Republic
 Žiželice (Louny District), village in Louny District, Czech Republic